Gmina Piaski may refer to either of the following administrative districts in Poland:
Gmina Piaski, Greater Poland Voivodeship
Gmina Piaski, Lublin Voivodeship